Singoli is a block and a nagar panchayat in Neemuch district in the Indian state of Madhya Pradesh.

Geography
It has an average elevation of 363 metres (1,190 feet). Singoli is located at the border of Madhya Pradesh and Rajasthan.

History
In 1336, Singoli was the site of a battle between the Rajput Rana of Mewar Hammir Singh and the Tughlaq Army, in which Hammir Singh defeated the Tughlaq army and Muhammad bin Tughluq was taken prisoner.

Demographics

 India census, Singoli had a population of 8,307 but now it is more than that this figure. Males constitute 51% of the population and females 49%. Singoli has an average literacy rate of 65%, higher than the national average of 59.5%: male literacy is 76%, and female literacy is 53%. In Singoli, 15% of the population is under 6 years of age.

Education

Singoli has two higher secondary schools in Hindi named Government Boys and Girls High Secondary School and Saraswati shishu mandir respectively.

References

Cities and towns in Neemuch district
Neemuch